The Bellin Run is a 10K (6.2-mile) race held annually on the east side of Green Bay, Wisconsin, just outside Bellin Memorial Hospital, the race's founding organization.  The first Bellin 10K was held on June 12, 1977 and was known as the Bellin Heartwarming Run designed to promote cardiovascular fitness and wellness.  The run was intended to be a one-time event to help celebrate the dedication of the hospital's newly constructed additions.  The run drew 881 participants.

The following January, Bellin began receiving calls about when the next running event would be scheduled.  Bellin officials decided to hold a second run, titled the Bellin 10K Run, to see if it would be as successful as the first.  More than 1,100 runners participated in the second run and a new tradition was born.

Over the years the event has grown in stature and overall participation.  By 2009, the Bellin Run was among the top 10 largest timed 10K races in the nation.  In 2013, a record 20,000 people registered for the event.  The course is United States Track and Field certified and the run is sanctioned by the Athletics Congress.  Many features have been added to the run over the years such as computerized chip timing, corral starts, preferred starting positions for faster runners, post race refreshments, entertainment along the course, an All-You-Can-Eat Spaghetti Dinner, and a free Health Expo the night before the run.


Course

The Bellin Run is a 10K (6.2-mile) road race.  The race begins under the Bellin Hospital skywalk on Webster Avenue and draws hundreds of spectators.  The race brings participants south on Webster Avenue and continues through the streets of Green Bay and the neighboring community of Allouez before returning to the Webster Avenue finish line.  The course is relatively flat, with the exception of an extended downhill stretch on Greene Avenue in Allouez.  The race creates a number of road closures that morning to ensure safety, and a collaboration of safety departments from the city of Green Bay, the village of Allouez and the Brown County Sheriff's Department help to ensure the safety of participants and spectators.  Times are given at each mile point and water stations are located at 1.8, 3.4, 4.7 and 5.7 mile distances. Medical personnel are available on the course for any person in need of assistance.

Focus on health and overall well-being
The Bellin Run focuses on encouraging widespread fitness, routine exercise and healthy living. The annual event is designed to be a competitive race that also includes casual runners and walkers,a community building event that promotes regular physical fitness and improved nutrition.

Entertainment
The Bellin Run offers diverse entertainment throughout the course, including music, designated cheering squads and street performers.  This is meant to help entertain the runners as they pass by, while also entertaining neighboring families that live on or around the course.

Friday night festivities

Children's Run and Fun event
In 1991, a noncompetitive children's run was added.  In 1995 that run was dedicated to the memory of Dick Lytie, an avid Green Bay-area runner and Bellin Run supporter who died in the summer of 1994.  Due to its popularity and size, the run now takes place on the Friday evening before the Bellin Run.  It features a half mile course for kids age 10 and under.  In 2011, registration for the Children's Run was more than 3,000 participants making it a large part of the Bellin Run experience. Schneider National Trucking company is the major sponsor behind the Children's Run.

Health and Fitness Expo
On the Friday evening before the Bellin Run, Astor Park plays host to a health and fitness expo coordinated by Bellin Health.  The expo features, an all-you-can-eat spaghetti dinner, booths with health-themed vendors, and a number of activities for children.  The Friday activities include a large playground for children, inflatable toys, live entertainment, and a meet-and-greet autograph session with the elite athletes.

Race registration information
Registration for the Bellin Run historically had been via conventional mail or drop-off.  In 2006, Bellin Run organizers offered for the first time an online registration option.  A price discount is currently offered to those who register online. In addition, organizers encourage online registration because it is more convenient for registration officials and it aligns with the race's go green initiatives.  Online registration for the 2017 Bellin Run will close June 8. The price points are as follows:

Free training program
Bellin Health provides free training sessions during a 12-week program called "Run a Better Bellin."  The program gives runners and walkers a community setting to train for the 10K race. The program is open to walkers and runners of all experience levels.

Charity

Nursing scholarship
Each year, a portion of the proceeds from the Bellin Run are used to support the Bellin College scholarship fund. The fund aids qualified nursing students.  Since 1991 Bellin has contributed a portion of the Bellin Run proceeds to the scholarship fund, and as of 2011 more than $160,000 had been raised.

Volunteers
The Bellin Run relies heavily on the participation of volunteers.  Nearly 1,000 volunteers assist with the run each year. Volunteers fill a number of needs on and around the race course and its related events.  Volunteers participate in activities ranging from water distribution and traffic regulation to assistance with the Friday night events and race registration.  All volunteers receive a commemorative Bellin Run T-shirt.

Special participation

Corporate challenge
The Corporate Challenge for the Bellin Run is a friendly competition among area companies. The companies compete to determine which businesses can post the best finish times and secure the highest participation rates. It's another way Bellin Run organizers encourage members of the community to increase their physical fitness levels and embrace a healthier lifestyle.

The corporate challenge fosters increased camaraderie through friendly competition.

Some of the benefits of being a Corporate Challenge participant include: A team photograph, discounted rates for the spaghetti dinner, and a company tent for employees the morning of the race.  Companies also compete in a T-shirt challenge to see which business designs the most creative T-shirt. Winners receive a small prize. Nearly 250 companies participated in 2011.

Kids for Running
Kids for Running is a training program designed to get kids in third through eighth grades active and health-conscious in their formative years. Several thousand kids from schools across Wisconsin and Michigan's Upper Peninsula participate in the program each year culminating in their participation in the 10K race.  The program is fully integrated in participating schools' physical education programs.

The Kids for Running program encourages Bellin's theme of encouraging communitywide health and fitness. Research suggests that learning healthy habits at a younger age will likely lead to healthier lifestyle choices in the future.

The program, much like the Bellin Run Corporate Challenge, offers a T-shirt contest.  An award is given to the student whose design for their school is deemed the best.

High School Challenge
Under this program, students and staff from area high schools compete with other schools to determine who can earn the highest participation rate in the Bellin Run (based on the percentage of the total number of students, staff and faculty). The winning school receives an award for display.

Another vehicle through which high schoolers are encouraged to participate in the Bellin Run is through the Running Buddies program.  This program offers the opportunity for high schoolers to mentor younger students enrolled in the Bellin Run Kids for Running program.  These young mentors earn community service hours for their participation, and a discounted Bellin Run registration fee.

Back to the Road Crew
Individuals who have faced recovery and rehabilitation from surgery or a major illness are invited to participate in a shortened version of the Bellin Run. This shortened course is offered through Bellin Health's "Back to the Road" program.  The program helps get orthopedic, cardiac rehab and general rehab patients active again after medical treatment. It is an invitation-only event. Participants walk or run a 1-mile route of the Bellin Run, however, some complete the entire 10K route.

My Team Triumph
My Team Triumph is a ride-along program for kids and adults who have disabilities that severely limit them from participating in road races and other similar events.  The disabled participants, also known as "captains," are pushed or pulled along the course in modified carriages by their "angels" or volunteers who help to chauffeur the carriages to the finish.

Recent changes

Corral system starts
The Bellin Run 10K currently offers seven corrals to begin the race. There are five corrals of runners followed by a stroller division in the sixth wave. Walkers occupy the seventh wave. Stroller participants in 2009 started at the same time as walkers.
The corral system was added for the 2011 race as the result of feedback from participants in 2010 Bellin Run. The change was an effort to address future growth, according to Bellin Run organizers. 
The corral system start was first employed by the Bellin Run in 2011 after seven consecutive years of record-breaking attendance. 
Corral system starts feature a continuous line of participants seeded by their anticipated pace.  The line moves forward until all runners and walkers cross the start line.

Astor Park
Astor Park is home to pre-race activities and locations such as the Friday Night Children's Run, the spaghetti dinner, the registration tent, elite athlete autograph session, and entertainment. On race day is the landing zone for all post-race events including the awards ceremony, refreshments, post-race results, musical entertainment and more.

The transition to Astor Park was made starting in 2008 once it was determined that it offered much more space for the continually growing race event than the previously used Baird Park.

Chip timing
Electronic timing chips have been used in the Bellin Run since 2000.  The timing chips record when each runner passes the start line and when they cross the finish. The timing chips are typically fastened to a runner's shoe and depending on the type of timing chip, can be recycled after use. The Bellin Run has mostly employed the use of recyclable timing chips. Chip timing has led to more accurate electronic results.

Parking and shuttles
Parking for the Bellin Run is available in identified lots and on city streets near Bellin Memorial Hospital.  However, to help ease the congestion, there is a free shuttle service offered from off-site lots.  Participants and spectators may park and be shuttled in from one of two locations: the East Town Mall former Shopko retail store (in east Green Bay), or the Bay Park Square Mall former Shopko location (near the west side of Green Bay).  Shuttles pick up participants at both locations every 15 minutes from 6:30 to 7:30 a.m. and drop them off at Astor Park. Return shuttles run from 9 a.m. to noon.

Interesting fact sheet

Elite athletes
World-class runners have always been a part of the Bellin Run.  This started with Frank Shorter in 1977 and has included others such as Bill Rodgers, Rosa Mota, Joan Samuelson, Simeon Kigen, Lisa Weidenbach, Bruce Bickford, Ed Eyestone, John Campbell, Dan Held, Suzy Favor-Hamilton, Bob Kempainen, Elva Dryer, Elana Meyer, Joeseph Kimani, Uta Pippig, Tegla Loroupe, Khalid Khannouchi, Jean Driscoll, and John Kipsang Korir.

The field of world-class runners has included former and current Olympians, national marathon champions, international elites, a number of 10K record holders and many other accomplished participants.

Notable runners

Past winners
All results from official Bellin Run website.

Winners by country

Corporate Challenge Winners

Bellin Run Record Holders By Age Group
Key:

References

Sports in Green Bay, Wisconsin
10K runs in the United States
Recurring events established in 1970
Annual sporting events in the United States